This is a list of presidential trips made by Barack Obama during 2009, the first year of his presidency as the 44th president of the United States. Following his inauguration on January 20, 2009, Obama traveled to 22 different states internationally, in addition to many more trips made domestically within the United States.

This list excludes trips made within Washington, D.C., the U.S. federal capital in which the White House, the official residence and principal workplace of the president, is located. Additionally excluded are trips to Camp David, the country residence of the president, and to the private home of the Obama family in Kenwood, Chicago.

January
No trips made.

February

March

April

May

June

July

August

September

October

November

December

References

2009 in the United States
Presidential travels of Barack Obama
Lists of events in the United States
2009-related lists
2009 in international relations